The Abkhaz Autonomous Soviet Socialist Republic, abbreviated as Abkhaz ASSR, was an autonomous republic of the Soviet Union within the Georgian SSR. It came into existence in February 1931, when the Socialist Soviet Republic of Abkhazia (SSR Abkhazia or SSRA), originally created in March 1921, was transformed  to the status of Autonomous Soviet Socialist Republic within the Georgian SSR.

The Abkhaz ASSR adopted its own constitution on 2 August 1937. The supreme organ of legislative power was the Supreme Soviet elected every 4 years and its Presidium. The executive power was vested with the Council of Ministers appointed by the Supreme Soviet. The Abkhaz ASSR had 11 representatives in the Council of Nationalities of the Supreme Soviet of the USSR.

History

Formation
The Socialist Soviet Republic of Abkhazia (SSR Abkhazia) had been established in 1921 after the Red Army invaded Georgia. The SSR Abkhazia, which was united with the Georgian SSR later that year as a "treaty republic," existed until 1931. During this time it was granted considerable amounts of autonomy, by virtue of its unique status in relation to Georgia. However this concerned the Soviet and Georgian authorities, and it was reduced to that of other autonomous republics. So on 19 February 1931 the SSR Abkhazia was reformed as the Abkhaz Autonomous Soviet Socialist Republic, wholly under the control of Georgia, which itself was a constituent republic of the Transcaucasian Socialist Federative Soviet Republic (TSFSR).

The downgrading of Abkhazia was not a popular one amongst the Abkhaz population. The SSR Abkhazia had a considerable degree of autonomy, including its own national symbols (a flag and coat-of-arms), and national army units, a right only given to full republics. It also had its own constitution, another right only granted to full republics. When it was reformed into the Abkhaz SSR protests broke out in the region, the first time large-scale protests against the Soviet authorities had occurred there.

Dissolution
The advent of perestroika allowed the Abkhaz an outlet to express their dissatisfaction of their status within Georgia. In 1988 a letter, signed by leading Abkhazians, was forwarded to Mikhail Gorbachev and the Soviet leadership. It outlined the grievances the Abkhaz felt and argued that despite the concessions of 1978, autonomy had largely been ignored in the region. It concluded by asking for Abkhazia to be removed from the Georgian SSR, and it to be restored as a full Soviet republic, akin to the SSR Abkhazia. This was followed in March 1989 with the Lykhny Declaration, which was a document signed by some 37,000 people. This led to protests in Georgia, which culminated into a massive major anti-Soviet and pro-Georgian independence rally in Tbilisi on 9 April 1989, which was violently dispersed by Soviet Interior Ministry troops, resulting in the deaths of twenty, mostly young women, and the injury of hundreds of demonstrators. The 9 April tragedy removed the last vestiges of credibility from the Soviet regime in Georgia and pushed many Georgians into radical opposition to the Soviet Union, and exacerbated ethnic tensions between Georgians and other groups, in particular the Abkhaz and Ossetians. Further riots in Sukhumi opposing the establishment of a branch of the Tbilisi State University exacerbated Abkhaz nationalism.

Tensions remained high in Abkhazia and saw the Abkhaz totally disregard Georgian authority in the region. This was confirmed on 25 August 1990, when the Abkhaz Supreme Soviet passed a declaration, "On Abkhazia's State Sovereignty," which gave supremacy to Abkhaz laws over Georgian ones. The Supreme Soviet also declared Abkhazia to be a full union republic within the Soviet Union.

The victory of a nationalist coalition in October 1990 only further led to increased issues, as the newly elected Chairman of the Georgian Supreme Soviet, Zviad Gamsakhurdia, was outspoken in his desire to reduce the autonomy of the non-Georgian population in the country. By this point, however, Georgian authority had effectively ceased in Abkhazia: Abkhazia took part in the Soviet referendum on 17 March 1991, which the rest of Georgia boycotted, while the non-Georgian population of the region (along with South Ossetia, another autonomous region of Georgia), in turn boycotted the referendum on independence on 9 April 1991.

A power-sharing deal was agreed upon in August 1991, dividing electoral districts by ethnicity, with the 1991 elections held under this format, though it did not last. However, with the breakdown of the Gamsakhurida government in Georgia, and efforts by Eduard Shevardnadze to delegitimize Gamsakhurdia by failing to honour agreements he signed, and Abkhaz desires to utilize the ongoing Georgian Civil War, it fell apart. Thus on 23 July 1992, the Abkhaz Supreme Soviet re-instated the 1925 constitution, which had called Abkhazia a sovereign state, albeit one in treaty union with Georgia. Georgia responded militarily on 14 August, starting a war that would last until September 1993, and further lead to the ongoing Abkhaz–Georgian conflict.

Culture

Language
The Abkhaz language saw multiple changes in script during the Soviet era. Under korenizatsiya the Abkhaz were not considered one of the "advanced" peoples in the USSR, and thus saw an increased focus on their national language and cultural development. As part of these policies, the Abkhaz language script was Latinized in 1928, along with many other regional languages in the USSR, moving from the original Cyrillic-based script in the process. This policy was reversed in 1938, with Cyrillic replacing most of the Latin alphabets. Abkhaz was one of the few exceptions; along with Ossetian in the South Ossetian Autonomous Oblast (also of the Georgian SSR), it adopted a Georgian script, which lasted until 1953 when it reverted to Cyrillic (Ossetian did the same).

See also

 Abkhaz Regional Committee of the Communist Party of Georgia

Notes

Bibliography

External links
"Abkhaz Autonomous Soviet Socialist Republic", Big Soviet Encyclopedia .

1931 establishments in the Soviet Union
1991 disestablishments in the Soviet Union
Autonomous republics of the Soviet Union
Abkhaz Autonomous Soviet Socilaist Republics
Politics of Abkhazia
History of Abkhazia
20th century in Georgia (country)
States and territories established in 1931
States and territories disestablished in 1991